British Rail Class 99 may refer to:

British Rail Class 99 (ships)
British Rail Class 99 (locomotive)